Utricularia incisa is a medium-sized suspended aquatic carnivorous plant that belongs to the genus Utricularia (family Lentibulariaceae). It is probably a perennial plant. U. incisa is only known from specimens from Cuba (Isle of Pines and Pinar del Río) and appears to be endemic to the country.

See also 
 List of Utricularia species

References 

Carnivorous plants of South America
Flora of Cuba
incisa
Flora without expected TNC conservation status